Robert Charles Anderson (born 7 November 1947) is an English former professional darts player who won the 1988 BDO World Darts Championship. Nicknamed The Limestone Cowboy, he was the World No. 1 player for over three years in the late 1980s.

Before darts
Anderson threw his first darts maximum (180) at the age of just seven. However, he was renowned as a champion athlete during his teenage years. He was picked as a javelin thrower in the British Olympic team of 1968, but broke his arm before the team left for Mexico, an injury which brought an end to his javelin-throwing career. He then turned his attention to football – playing to a moderately high standard for Lincoln United, Guildford City, Woking and Farnborough Town. During this time, he had continued to play darts socially and decided to take up the game more seriously when his injury jinx struck again – this time a broken leg in 1970 ended his football career.

Darts success
Anderson had a long and successful darts career, winning the World Professional Championship in 1988 and the Winmau World Masters in 1986, 1987 and 1988 – the first man to win the Masters in three successive years. Only Martin Adams has since emulated this feat by winning the 2008, 2009 and 2010 tournaments. 

Two years after his world title success he underwent surgery to fix a back problem that threatened his darts career. He returned to the game professionally but never reached the same heights he had achieved in the 1980s. Anderson was amongst the players who formed the Professional Darts Corporation – an organisation (originally known as the World Darts Council) which separated from the existing governing body, the British Darts Organisation in 1992–93. Anderson reached the final of the first WDC event, the Lada UK Masters, in November 1993 – losing to Mike Gregory.

His world ranking stayed sufficiently high to earn automatic qualification for most major PDC tournaments, and he went on to reach the semi-finals of the PDC World Darts Championship in 2004 and 2005.

In 1996, Anderson won the WDC World Pairs event alongside Phil Taylor. Anderson and Taylor defeated Chris Mason and Steve Raw in the final.

Anderson was also the driving force behind the Bob Anderson Classic, a major darts tournament held every October. The tournament started in 2002 and ran until 2005.

In 2008, Anderson decided to take part in the BetFred League of Legends which was shown live on Setanta Sports and play along with the likes of Eric Bristow, Keith Deller, John Lowe and Dave Whitcombe. However, in doing so, he was forced to resign from the PDC to take part in the league. He does, however, remain a lifetime member of the PDPA, granted to him because he was a founder member of the WDC (now PDC). Anderson went on the capture the League of Legends title, beating Keith Deller in the final.

World Championship results

BDO
1984: 1st Round (lost to Stefan Lord 0–2)
1985: 2nd Round (lost to Dave Whitcombe 1–3)
1986: Semi-Finals (lost to Dave Whitcombe 4–5)
1987: Quarter-Finals (lost to Alan Evans 3–4)
1988: Winner (beat John Lowe 6–4)
1989: Semi-Finals (lost to Jocky Wilson 4–5)
1990: 1st Round (lost to Jann Hoffmann 2–3)
1991: Semi-Finals (lost to Dennis Priestley 2–5)
1992: 2nd Round (lost to Graham Miller 2–3)
1993: Quarter-Finals (lost to Steve Beaton 1–4)

PDC
1994: Quarter-Finals (lost to Phil Taylor 2–4)
1995: Quarter-Finals (lost to Phil Taylor 1–4)
1996: Group Stage (beat Gerald Verrier 3–1) & (lost to Jamie Harvey 2–3)
1997: Group Stage (lost to Eric Bristow 1–3) & (beat Gary Mawson 3–1)
1998: Group Stage (lost to Shayne Burgess 0–3) & (beat Gerald Verrier 3–1)
1999: Quarter-Finals (lost to Phil Taylor 0–4)
2000: 1st Round (lost to Peter Manley 0–3)
2001: 1st Round (lost to Rod Harrington 1–3)
2002: 1st Round (lost to Steve Beaton 3–4)
2003: 2nd Round (lost to Colin Lloyd 3–4)
2004: Semi-Finals (lost to Kevin Painter 0–6)
2005: Semi-Finals (lost to Phil Taylor 2–6)
2006: 1st Round (lost to Andy Hamilton 2–3)
2007: 1st Round (lost to Darren Webster 1–3)
2008: 1st Round (lost to Jason Clark 2–3)

WSDT
 2022: 1st Round (lost to Robert Thornton 0–3)
 2023: 1st Round (lost to Andy Jenkins 0–3)

Performance timeline

Outside darts

Bob married Sally Attwater on 8 April 2004 – he chose former World Champion dart player Eric Bristow as his best man. Anderson has two children, Jennie and David. He lists his hobbies as golf – with a handicap of six, and trout fishing. Anderson's sporting hero is golf legend Jack Nicklaus. Anderson lives in the Somerset sea-side resort town of Clevedon.

References

External links

Bob Anderson's Official Website
Team Unicorn biography page
Anderson's darts database

1947 births
English darts players
BDO world darts champions
Living people
People from Clevedon
Sportspeople from Winchester
British Darts Organisation players
Professional Darts Corporation founding players